Keshav K Pingali is an American computer scientist, currently the William Moncrief Chair of Grid and Distributed Computing at the University of Texas at Austin, and also a published author. He previously also held the India Chair of Computer Science at Cornell University and also the N. Rama Rao Professorship at India Institute of Technology. He is a Fellow of the American Association for the Advancement of Science, Association for Computing Machinery and Institute of Electrical and Electronics Engineers. In 2020, he was elected a Foreign Member of the Academia Europeana.

Keshav Pingali is the co-founder and CEO of Katana Graph, which is building a high-performance, scale-out platform for graph querying, graph analytics, graph mining and graph AI workloads. Katana Graph announced its 28.5 million in Series A funding in February 2021, and in April of that year, the startup also announced its partnership with Intel to optimize their graph engine for the new 3rd Gen Intel Xeon Scalable processor (IceLake) and for Optane, Intel's non-volatile memory system. Keshav was also the keynote speaker at the 2021 Knowledge Graph Conference.

References

Year of birth missing (living people)
Living people
University of Texas at Austin faculty
American computer scientists
Indian computer scientists
Cornell University faculty
American chief executives